is a Shinto shrine located in the city of  Utsunomiya, Tochigi Prefecture, Japan. Along with the Futarasan Shrine in  Nikkō, it  is one of the two shrines claiming the title of ichinomiya of former Shimotsuke Province. The shrine's main festival is held annually on October 21. It is located on the summit of Mt. Myōjin (Usugamine; elevation, 135 meters) in the center of Utsunomiya city.

Enshrined kami
, eldest son of the semi-legendary Emperor Sujin 
,  god of nation-building, agriculture, business, medicine, brewing, and seafaring
, son of Ōmononushi, one of the eight deities charged with protecting the Imperial Court

History
According to the shrine's legend, when Emperor Nintoku divided the ancient province of Keno at the Kinugawa River into Kamitsukeno (上毛野) and Shimotsukeno (下毛野) (later Kōzuke and Shimotsuke) in the 5th century, he appointed Narawake-no-kimi as the kuni no miyatsuko of Shimotsukeno. This Narawake-no-kimi built a shrine to honor his great-grandfather Prince Toyokiirihiko as ujigami of the region. Per the Nihon Shoki, Prince Toyokiirihiko had been dispatched by his father Emperor Sujin to rule over Keno in response to a dream in which he had climbed Mount Miwa and swung a spear and a sword to the east. When he travelled to his new territory, he brought with him a bunrei of the kami Ōmononushi from Ōmiwa Shrine.  The original location of the shrine was a place called Araozaki on the south side across the main street from the current location, but in 838 the shrine was relocated to the current location at Usugamine (Mt. Myōjin). There are many shrines called "Futarasan Shrine", mainly in the Kantō region, but only this shrine, and the one in Nikkō have an ancient origin and are listed in the early Heian  period Engishiki.  As Prince Toyokiirihiko excelled in the martial arts, the shrine was patronized by famous military commanders throughout its history. Fujiwara Hidesato was able to defeat Taira no Masakado in the Jōhei-Tengyō Rebellion using a magic sword received from this shrine. Per the Heike Monogatari, Nasu no Yoichi prayed to the shrine during the Battle of Yashima. Minamoto no Yoriyoshi, Minamoto no Yoshiie, Minamoto no Yoritomo, and Tokugawa Ieyasu prayed for victory and made various donations and renovations of the shrine.

The place name of "Utsunomiya" is derived from the name of this shrine, and the Utsunomiya clan, a cadet branch of the Fujiwara clan who ruled his area for some five centuries from the end of the Heian period, were originally kannushi of the Futarasan Shrine.

Under State Shinto of the early Meiji period, the shrine received the designation of  under the Modern system of ranked Shinto shrines in 1871. It was demoted to a prefectural shrine in 1873, but its rank was restored in 1883.

The shrine was once rebuilt every 20 years. In addition, the shrine burned down on several occasions, notably during the invasion of Utsunomiya by the Late Hōjō clan in 1585, during the fires in Utsunomiya in 1773 and 1832, and during the Battle of Utsunomiya Castle in 1868 during the Boshin War. The current shrine was rebuilt as a temporary shrine by the new Meiji government in 1877.

The shrine is a ten-minute walk from Tōbu-Utsunomiya Station on the Tobu Utsunomiya Line.

Cultural Properties

Important Cultural Properties
, Nanboku-chō period, made by joining 38 sections of iron base plates and hitting studs from the back, in the shape of a star.
, Kamakura period, made of cast iron.

See also
List of Shinto shrines
Ichinomiya

References

External links

Official website

Shinto shrines in Tochigi Prefecture
Ichinomiya
Shimotsuke Province
Utsunomiya